Pulau Brani is an island located off the southern coast of Singapore, near Keppel Harbour. The island is situated between the main island of Singapore and the resort island of Sentosa, and is linked to the mainland via Brani Terminal Avenue.

Historic use
The bulk of the island was occupied by the Malayan Command Ordnance Depot until 1937 when a new purpose built depot was constructed at Alexandra on the mainland.

The Straits Trading Co. built a tin smelting factory on Pulau Brani in 1890 to process the tin ores mined in mainland Malaya. The factory was on the island for more than 70 years before it had to move out to make way for the Brani Naval Base in the late 1960s. 

The British army had their maritime (water transport) base here, first with the RASC and then the RCT. Many families lived in the married quarters on the island. Primary children attended the British army school located near Buller Jetty, as did the children from army families on Blakang Mati (now Sentosa). Secondary age children had to go to the mainland by ferry, attending the Alexandra Schools at Gillman Barracks, then after 1964 either Bourne (in the Gillman buildings) or the brand new St John's Comprehensive in what is now the United World College in Dover Road.

Current use
After Singapore's independence, Brani Naval Base was built on Pulau Brani. The Navy moved to Changi and Tuas Naval Bases, and the Police Coast Guard took over that site. The rest of Pulau Brani was developed as Brani Container Terminal (see Port of Singapore).

Future use
Pulau Brani is intended to be re-developed to host a resort and other tourist attractions as part of the Greater Southern Waterfront project. Brani Container Terminal will be consolidated at the Tuas Mega Port for this to occur.

Popular culture
Pulau Brani is featured in the 2021 video game Battlefield 2042 as the setting of multiplayer map Manifest.

References

Sources
Victor R Savage, Brenda S A Yeoh (2003), Toponymics - A Study of Singapore Street Names, Eastern Universities Press,

External links
Satellite image - Google Maps

Brani
Bukit Merah